Kenkichi Sugimoto (杉本健吉) (September 20, 1905 in Nagoya – February 10, 2004 in Nagoya) is a Japanese artist. He was known as an oil painter, illustrator, and graphic designer.

In 1987 the Meitetsu railroad company opened the Sugimoto Art Museum in Mihama, Aichi.

External links 
 Homepage of the Sugimoto Art Museum
 Artnet | Kenkichi Sugimoto

1905 births
2004 deaths
Japanese graphic designers
People from Nagoya
Yōga painters
20th-century Japanese painters